The Lady of the Camellias (Swedish: Damen med kameliorna) is a 1925 Swedish silent historical drama film directed by Olof Molander and starring Tora Teje, Uno Henning and Nils Aréhn. It was shot at the Råsunda Studios in Stockholm. The film's sets were designed by the art director Vilhelm Bryde. It is an adaptation of the 1848 novel The Lady of the Camellias by Alexandre Dumas.

Cast
 Tora Teje as 	Marguerite Gautier
 Uno Henning as Armand Duval
 Nils Aréhn as 	George Duval
 Hilda Borgström as 	Prudence
 Paul Lane as Erneste de Giray
 Sven Bergvall as 	Alphonse de Varville
 Carl Browallius as 	Duke de Mauriac
 Torsten Winge as 	Gaston
 Alfred Lundberg as 	Morizot
 Lisskulla Jobs as 	Blanche Duval
 Ragnar Arvedson as Blanche's Fiancé
 Anders Henrikson as The Duke's Spy
 Tore Lindwall as 	Gustave
 Margit Manstad as 	Nichette
 Bertil Ehrenmark as Servant 
 Justus Hagman as 	Joseph 
 Thure Holm as 	Doctor 
 Knut Lambert as 	Guest of Marguerite 
 Ester Textorius as 	Olympe 
 Tom Walter as Errand Boy

References

Bibliography
 Qvist, Per Olov & von Bagh, Peter. Guide to the Cinema of Sweden and Finland. Greenwood Publishing Group, 2000.

External links

1925 films
1925 drama films
Swedish silent feature films
Swedish black-and-white films
Films directed by Olof Molander
1920s Swedish-language films
Films based on French novels
Swedish historical drama films
1920s historical drama films
Films set in the 19th century
Silent historical drama films
1920s Swedish films